Kleberg is an area in southeast Dallas, Texas, United States that was formerly an unincorporated community in Dallas County.

History
In 1956 Kleberg incorporated as a city. By 1970 4,510 people lived in Kleberg and three businesses resided in Kleberg. By 1978 Kleberg was the largest town in Texas with no property tax. On April 3, 1978 the city ceased to exist and the land became part of the City of Dallas.

Government and infrastructure
Fire Station 9 of the Dallas Fire Department, serving Kleberg, opened on April 1, 1978. Before then the building served as the Kleberg City Hall, the Kleberg Police Department station, and the Kleberg Volunteer Fire Department station. In 1989 the fire station moved into a new building.

The United States Postal Service operates what was once the Kleberg Post Office at 15300 Seagoville Road. It has been renamed the Seagoville Post Office as of April 8, 2011. The smaller post office in Seagoville located at 314 Glendale Ave was permanently closed; it was scheduled for closure after October 31, 2011 when it reaches the end of their current three-month lease on the building.

Education
Kleberg is in Dallas Independent School District. The area is within the Board of Trustees District 4; as of 2008 Nancy Bingham represents the district. Zoned schools include Kleberg Elementary School, Seagoville Middle School, and Seagoville High School.

Kleberg was absorbed into the Seagoville Independent School District in the late 1940s-early 1950s period, and it in turn became a part of DISD in August 1964.

Dallas Public Library operates the Kleberg-Rylie Branch Library at 1301 Edd Road.

Parks and recreation
The Kleberg-Rylie Community Center, operated by Dallas Parks, serves the community.

References

External links

 Seagoville Middle School - Located in Kleberg
 Kleberg Elementary School

Neighborhoods in South Dallas
Former cities in Texas
Populated places disestablished in 1978